Doris bicolor is a species of sea slug, a dorid nudibranch, a marine gastropod mollusk in the family Dorididae.

Distribution
This species was described from Trieste, Italy.

References

Dorididae
Gastropods described in 1884